The 2020–21 Serbian SuperLiga  (known as the Linglong Tire SuperLiga for sponsorship reasons) was the fifteenth of the Serbian SuperLiga since its establishment. Red Star were the defending champions from the previous season.

Due to the COVID-19 pandemic in the 2019–20 Serbian SuperLiga season, no club has been relegated to the Serbian First League, and four clubs from the 2019–20 Serbian First League were promoted to the 2020–21 Serbian SuperLiga.

Teams

The league consisted of 20 teams: sixteen teams from the 2019–20 Serbian SuperLiga and four new teams from the 2019–20 Serbian First League, Zlatibor Čajetina, Metalac Gornji Milanovac, Bačka Bačka Palanka and Novi Pazar.

Venues

Personnel, Kits and General sponsor

Note: Flags indicate national team as has been defined under FIFA eligibility rules. Players and Managers may hold more than one non-FIFA nationality.

Nike is the official ball supplier for Serbian SuperLiga.

Kelme is the official sponsor of the Referee's Committee of the Football Association of Serbia.

Managerial changes

Foreign players
Foreign players: there are no restrictions on a number of signed foreign players, but clubs can only register up to four foreign players for a single match-day squad.

Transfers

For the list of transfers involving SuperLiga clubs during 2020–21 season, please see: List of Serbian football transfers summer 2020.

League table

Results

Individual statistics

Top goalscorers
As of matches played on 19 May 2021.

Hat-tricks

Player of the week
As of matches played on 15 May 2021.

References

External links
 
 UEFA

Serbia
Serbian SuperLiga seasons
2020–21 in Serbian football leagues